The Story of Dr. Wassell is a 1944 American World War II film set in the Dutch East Indies, directed by Cecil B. DeMille, and starring Gary Cooper, Laraine Day, Signe Hasso and Dennis O'Keefe. The film was based on a book of the same name by novelist and screenwriter James Hilton.

The book and film were inspired by the wartime activities of U.S. Navy Doctor Corydon M. Wassell which were referred to by President Roosevelt in a radio broadcast made in April 1942. The appropriate section of this broadcast appears toward the end of the film.

For their work on this film, Farciot Edouart, Gordon Jennings and George Dutton received a nomination for the Oscar for Best Effects.

Plot
Dr. Wassell is a missionary doctor from Arkansas, who had in the past worked in China (which is shown in the first half of the film as a series of flashback (narrative)s) and after the Japanese invasion of Batavia finds himself (now as a doctor in the US Navy) caring for twelve American soldiers badly wounded during Japanese  strafing of some cruisers. Ignoring advice to abandon his patients, Wassell manages to care for them while leading them through the jungle until they can be evacuated by boat to Australia.

Cast 
 Gary Cooper as Dr. Corydon M. Wassell
 Laraine Day as Madeleine
 Signe Hasso as Bettina
 Dennis O'Keefe as Benjamin 'Hoppy' Hopkins
 Carol Thurston as Tremartini 
 Carl Esmond as Lt. Dirk Van Daal
 Paul Kelly as Murdock
 Elliott Reid as William 'Andy' Anderson
 Stanley Ridges as Cmdr. William B. 'Bill' Goggins
 Renny McEvoy as Johnny Leeweather
 Oliver Thorndike as Alabam
 Philip Ahn as Ping
 Barbara Britton as Ruth
 Cecil B. DeMille as Narrator (uncredited) 
 unbilled players include Richard Aherne, Irving Bacon, Sven Hugo Borg, Victor Borge, Yvonne De Carlo, Ann Doran, Milton Kibbee, Elmo Lincoln, Richard Loo, Gavin Muir, Jack Norton and Philip Van Zandt

Production
It was originally announced that Yvonne De Carlo would play the role of the Javanese nurse.

DeMille wanted Alan Ladd to play the role of Hoppy, but he had to go into military service.

Reception
A contemporary review by Bosley Crowther in The New York Times described the film as "blood, sweat and tears built up to spectacle in the familiar De Mille "epic" style," and "a fiction which is as garish as the spires of Hollywood. [De Mille] has telescoped fact with wildest fancy in the most flamboyantly melodramatic way. And he has messed up a simple human story with the cheapest kind of comedy and romance," adding that De Mille "has worked in enough pyrotechnics to leave the audience suffering from shell shock." A review of the film in Variety reported that "The exploits of the by-now famed naval commander are brought to the screen on a lavish scale by Cecil B. DeMille, with an exceptionally fine cast and good comedy relief," further noting that the film features "one of Cooper’s best performances." Writing in AllMovie, critic Craig Butler notes in his review that although "Cecil B. DeMille and his writers have tricked out [the plot] with cliché after cliché, including an entirely extraneous volcano explosion," the film "ends up being a good enough movie, thanks to the underlying idea, DeMille's adept way of handling over-the-top action plots and Gary Cooper's contrasting customary underplaying."

The film was the seventh most popular film of the year released in Australia in 1945, and the fifth most popular movie of 1946 in France with admissions of 5,866,693.

In popular culture

In the Truman Capote novella Breakfast at Tiffany's, Holly Golightly was to have auditioned for the role of Dr. Wassel's nurse, but impulsively left for New York City.

References

External links

Roosevelt: 'A Call for Sacrifice', April 28, 1942

1944 films
1940s biographical drama films
American biographical drama films
Films scored by Victor Young
Films directed by Cecil B. DeMille
Paramount Pictures films
World War II films made in wartime
American war drama films
1940s war drama films
1944 drama films
Japan in non-Japanese culture
Films set in Indonesia
Pacific War films
1940s English-language films